The 2023 season is Kashima Antlers' 31st consecutive season in the J1 League, the top flight of Japanese football since the introduction of professional football in 1993. As well as the domestic league, they will compete in the Emperor's Cup and the J.League Cup.

Squad

Season squad

Transfers

Arrivals

Departures

Pre-season and friendlies

Competitions

J1 League

Results by matchday

Matches
The full league fixtures were released on 20 January 2023.

J.League Cup

Emperor's Cup

Statistics

Goalscorers 
The list is sorted by shirt number when total goals are equal.

Clean sheets
The list is sorted by shirt number when total clean sheets are equal.

References 

Kashima Antlers
Kashima Antlers seasons